Wolfgang Rihm (born 13 March 1952) is a German composer and academic teacher. He is musical director of the Institute of New Music and Media at the University of Music Karlsruhe and has been composer in residence at the Lucerne Festival and the Salzburg Festival. He was honoured as Officier of the Ordre des Arts et des Lettres in 2001. His musical work includes more than 500 works. In 2012, The Guardian wrote: "enormous output and bewildering variety of styles and sounds".

Career
Rihm was born on 13 March 1952, in Karlsruhe. Rihm's early work, combining contemporary techniques with the emotional volatility of Mahler and of Schoenberg's early expressionist period, was regarded by many as a revolt against the avant-garde generation of Boulez, Stockhausen (with whom he studied in 1972–73), and others, and led to a large number of commissions in the following years. From 1973 to 1976 he studied composition with Klaus Huber in Freiburg im Breisgau. Other teachers were Wolfgang Fortner and Humphrey Searle. In the late 1970s and early 1980s his name was associated with the movement called New Simplicity. In 1978 he became an instructor at the Darmstädter Ferienkurse. Since 1985 Rihm has been professor for composition at the Hochschule für Musik Karlsruhe. His work still continues to plough expressionist furrows, though the influence of Luigi Nono, Helmut Lachenmann and Morton Feldman, amongst others, has affected his style significantly.

Rihm is an extremely prolific composer, with hundreds of completed scores, a large portion of which are yet to be commercially recorded. (See the List of the compositions of Wolfgang Rihm, in German, or the IRCAM works list, in French). He does not always regard a finished work the last word on a subject—for example the orchestral work Ins Offene... (1990) was completely rewritten in 1992, and then used as the basis for his piano concerto Sphere (1994), before the piano part of Sphere was recast for the solo piano work Nachstudie (also 1994). (In 2002 Rihm also produced a new version of Nachstudie, Sphäre nach Studie, for harp, two double basses, piano and percussion, and also a new version of Sphere, called Sphäre um Sphäre, for two pianos and chamber ensemble.) Other important works include thirteen string quartets, the operas Die Hamletmaschine (1983–1986, text by Heiner Müller) and Die Eroberung von Mexico (1987–1991, based on texts by Antonin Artaud), over twenty song-cycles, the oratorio Deus Passus (1999–2000) commissioned by the Internationale Bachakademie Stuttgart, the chamber orchestra piece Jagden und Formen (1995–2001), more than thirty concertos and a series of related orchestral works bearing the title Vers une symphonie fleuve. The New York Philharmonic premièred Rihm's 2004 commission Two Other Movements. In 2008 Rihm composed KOLONOS | 2 Fragments by Hölderlin after Sophokles for orchestra and countertenor, premiered in Bad Wildbad with the countertenor Matthias Rexroth.

Invited by Walter Fink, he was the fifth composer featured in the annual Komponistenporträt of the Rheingau Musik Festival in 1995, in two programs of chamber music and Lied, also of Robert Schumann, including his works Fremde Szene I for piano trio, Vier Lieder after poems of Paul Celan, Klavierstück 7, Klavierstück 6, Das Rot, six songs after poems of Karoline von Günderrode, Antlitz for violin and piano, and Fremde Szene III. In 1995 he contributed Communio (Lux aeterna) to the Requiem of Reconciliation. He received an honorary doctorate of the Free University of Berlin in 1998. In 2003 he received the Ernst von Siemens Music Prize.

In March 2010 the BBC Symphony Orchestra featured the music of Rihm in one of their 'total immersion' weekends at the Barbican Centre, London. Recordings from this weekend were used for three 'Hear and Now' programmes on BBC Radio 3 dedicated to his work. On 27 July 2010, Rihm's opera Dionysos, based on Nietzsche’s late cycle of poems Dionysian-Dithyrambs, had its world premiere at the Salzburg Festival, conducted by Ingo Metzmacher, and designed by Jonathan Meese. This performance was voted World Premiere of the Year (Uraufführung des Jahres) for 2010/11 by Opernwelt magazine. He revised his Gegenstück (2006) for bass saxophone, percussion and piano, premiered by Trio Accanto on 16 August 2010 to celebrate the 80th birthday of Walter Fink. Anne-Sophie Mutter premiered his violin concerto Lichtes Spiel (Light Games) in Avery Fisher Hall with the New York Philharmonic on 18 November 2010.

Awards 
 1978 Kranichstein Music Prize
 1978 Reinhold Schneider Prize of the City of Freiburg
 1981 Beethoven Prize of the City of Bonn
 1986 Rolf Liebermann Prize for his opera The Hamlet Machine
 1997 Musical Composition Prize from The Prince Pierre Foundation
 1998 Jacob Burckhardt Prize from the Johann Wolfgang von Goethe Foundation
 2000 Bach Prize of the Free and Hanseatic City of Hamburg
 2001 Royal Philharmonic Society Award for the work Hunts and Forms (Jagden und Formen)
 2001 Officer of Arts and Letters by the French Ministry of Foreign Affairs
 2003 Ernst von Siemens Music Prize
 2004 Medal of Merit from the State of Baden-Württemberg
 2012 Pour le Mérite
 2014 Grand Cross of Merit with Star of the Federal Republic of Germany
 2014 Bavarian Maximilian Order for Science and Art
 2014 Robert Schumann Prize for Poetry and Music
 2017 European Church Music Prize
 2018 Foundation Prize of the Ecumenical Foundation for the Bible and Culture
 2019 German Music Authors' Prize (Lifetime achievement)

Honorary doctorates 
 1998 Free University of Berlin

Memberships 
 1983 Bayerische Akademie der Schönen Künste
 1986 Academy of Arts, Berlin
 1996 Deutsche Akademie für Sprache und Dichtung, Darmstadt
 2000 Freie Akademie der Künste Hamburg
 European Academy of Sciences and Arts

Notable students

Works

Stage works
Faust und Yorick (1976)
Jakob Lenz (1977–1978)
Die Hamletmaschine (1983–1986)
Oedipus (1986–1987)
Die Eroberung von Mexico (1987–1991)
Séraphin (1993–1994)
Dionysos (2009–2010)

Orchestral works
Form / 2 Formen (second state)
Gejagte Form (first version)
Gejagte Form (second version)
IN-SCHRIFT (1995)
Ernster Gesang (1996)
Jagden und Formen
Jagden und Formen (state 2008)
Symphony No. 1, Op. 3
Symphony No. 2 (first and last movement)
Sub-Kontur for large orchestra
Vers une symphonie fleuve I–IV
IN-SCHRIFT 2 (2013)

Concertante
Violin
Gesungene Zeit
Lichtes Spiel
COLL'ARCO 
Viola
Concerto for Viola and Orchestra
Concerto for Viola and Orchestra No. 2
Violoncello
Konzert in einem Satz
Monodram 
Styx und Lethe
Concerto en Sol (2018)
String quartet
"CONCERTO"
Clarinet
Musik für Klarinette und Orchester
Oboe
Musik für Oboe und Orchester
Bassoon
Psalmus
Trumpet
Gebild
Marsyas, Rhapsodie für Trompete mit Schlagzeug und Orchester
Trombone 
Canzona per sonare
Piano
Sphere
Harp
Die Stücke des Sängers
Organ
Unbenannt IV

Chamber Works
Chiffre-Zyklus
Chiffre I (1982)
Nach-Schrift (eine Chriffre) (1982/2004)
Silence to be beaten (Chiffre II) (1983)
Chiffre III (1983)
Chiffre IV (1983/84)
Chiffre V (1984)
Bild (eine Chiffre) (1984)
Chiffre VI (1984)
Chiffre VII (1985)
Chiffre VIII (1985/88)

String quartet
Grave
Quartettstudie
String Quartet No. 1
String Quartet No. 2
String Quartet No. 3
String Quartet No. 4
String Quartet No. 5
String Quartet No. 6
String Quartet No. 7
String Quartet No. 8
String Quartet No. 9
String Quartet No. 10
String Quartet No. 11
String Quartet No. 12
String Quartet No. 13

Vocal works
Voice and orchestra
Fünf Abgesangsszenen
Drei späte Gedichte von Heiner Müller
Ernster Gesang mit Lied
Frau / Stimme
Hölderlin-Fragmente
Lenz-Fragmente
Penthesilea Monolog
Rilke: Vier Gedichte

Voice and piano
Gesänge, Op. 1 (1968–71)
"Untergang" (Georg Trakl)
"Geistliche Dämmerung" (Trakl)
"Hälfte des Lebens" (Friedrich Hölderlin)
"Hochsommerbann" (Oskar Loerke)
"Abend" (August Stramm)
"Patrouille" (Stramm)
"Kriegsgrab" (Stramm)
"Sturmangriff" (Stramm)
"Lied" (Stefan George)
"Frühling" (Franz Büchler)
"Verzweifelt" (Stramm)
"Robespierre" (Georg Heym)
"Vorfrühling" (Reiner Maria Rilke)
Vier Gedichte aus "Atemwende" (Paul Celan) (1973)
Alexanderlieder (1975/76) for Mezzo-soprano, Baritone & 2 Pianos. (Ernst Herbeck)
Hölderlin-Fragmente (1976/77) piano version
Neue Alexanderlieder (1979) (Herbeck) for baritone
Lenz-Fragmente (1980) for tenor
Wölfli-Liederbuch (1980/81) bass-baritone & piano, with optional episodes for 2 bass drums (orch. version 1982)
Das Rot (Karoline von Gunderrode) (1990)
Vier Gedichte von Peter Härtling (1993)
Drei Gedichte von Monique Thoné (1997)
Apokryph (1997) (deathbed words attributed to Georg Büchner)
Nebendraußen (1998) (Hermann Lenz)
Ende der Handschrift. Elf späte Gedichte von Heiner Müller (1999)
Rilke: 4 Gedichte (2000) 
Sechs Gedichte von Friedrich Nietzsche (2001)
Lavant-Gesänge (2000–01). Fünf Gedichte von Christine Lavant
Brentano-Phantasie (2002) (Clemens Brentano)
Eins und doppelt (2004). Fünf Lieder aus dem Zwielicht, für Bariton und Klavier.
Abendempfindung (Arnim)
Gingo biloba (Goethe)
Dämmrung senkte sich von oben (Goethe)
Ausgang (Fontane)
Worte sind der Seele Bild (Goethe)
Drei Hölderlin-Gedichte (2004)
Abbitte
Hälfte des Lebens
An Zimmern
2 Sprüche (2005) (Friedrich Schiller)
Heine zu "Seraphine" (2006). Sieben Gedichte von Heinrich Heine
Goethe-Lieder (Johann Wolfgang von Goethe, 30'),  2004–07 
An Zelter
Gingo biloba
Dämerung senkte sich von oben
Worte sind der Seele Bild
Phänomen
Selige Sehnsucht
Parabase
Lebensgenuss
Höchste Gunst
Heut und ewig
Aus "Wilhelm Meisters Wanderjahren"
Willst du dir ein gut Leben zimmern
An Zelter
Wortlos (2007)
Vier Späte Gedichte von Friedrich Rückert baritone, 2008
Zwei Gedichte von Joseph Eichendorff (2009)
Zwei kleine Lieder (Eduard Mörike, 2009)
Auf dem See  for tenor (or high baritone) and piano 10’' (Conrad Ferdinand Meyer)

Choral works
Choir a cappella
Sieben Passions-Texte
Choir with orchestra or ensemble
Deus Passus
Astralis
Et Lux (2015 ECM Records)
Vigilia

Solo instruments
Über die Linie (violoncello)
Über die Linie VII (violin)

Piano solo
Auf einem anderen Blatt
Brahmsliebewalzer
Klavierstücke nos. 1–7 1970–80
Ländler 1979
Nachstudie
Zwiesprache 1999

Organ solo
Drei Fantasien

Writings

References

Further reading
 
  continued on page 43.

External links
 
 Wolfgang Rihm on The Living Composers Project, worklist
 Wolfgang Rihm on the Universal Edition website
 Interview with Rihm Ensemble Sospeso, New York
 
 
  

1952 births
Living people
20th-century classical composers
21st-century classical composers
German opera composers
Male opera composers
Officiers of the Ordre des Arts et des Lettres
Musicians from Karlsruhe
Members of the Academy of Arts, Berlin
Members of the European Academy of Sciences and Arts
Recipients of the Pour le Mérite (civil class)
Pupils of Karlheinz Stockhausen
Pupils of Wolfgang Fortner
German male classical composers
20th-century German composers
Knights Commander of the Order of Merit of the Federal Republic of Germany
Recipients of the Order of Merit of Baden-Württemberg
Ernst von Siemens Music Prize winners
String quartet composers
Composers for piano
21st-century German composers
Hochschule für Musik Karlsruhe alumni
Academic staff of the Hochschule für Musik Karlsruhe
Hochschule für Musik Freiburg alumni
20th-century German male musicians
21st-century German male musicians